The 2010 College Basketball Invitational (CBI) is a single-elimination tournament of 16 National Collegiate Athletic Association (NCAA) Division I teams that did not participate in the 2010 NCAA Division I men's basketball tournament or the 2010 National Invitation Tournament. The opening round began Tuesday, March 16. A best-of-three championship series between the two teams in the final was held on March 29, March 31, and April 2.

Participants

Round 1 away teams

Round 1 home teams

Bracket

* Denotes overtime period.

College Basketball Invitational
College Basketball Invitational